Jesús Sanoja Hernández (Tumeremo, Bolívar state 27 June 1930 - Caracas, 9 June 2007), was a Venezuelan journalist, historian and writer, who authored Entre golpes y revoluciones (2007).

Works 

 Entre golpes y revoluciones (2007).

External links 
Review about Sanoja Hernández at Correodelcaroni.com 

1930 births
2007 deaths
Venezuelan journalists
Venezuelan literary critics
Venezuelan male writers
20th-century Venezuelan historians
Central University of Venezuela alumni
Academic staff of the Central University of Venezuela
20th-century male writers
20th-century journalists